Laurel van der Wal (September 22, 1924 – August 13, 2009) was an American aeronautical engineer who is known for contributions to bioastronautics. She was named the Los Angeles Times's "1960 Woman of the Year in Science" for her contributions to the field.

Early life and education
Laurel van der Wal was born in San Francisco, the daughter of Lillian and Richard van der Wal, both from Spokane, Washington.  Her mother was a former teacher and an alumna of the University of Washington; her father was a businessman.  She graduated from high school at age 15, and worked as a model, an art instructor, a deputy sheriff, a showgirl, a railroad switch tower operator, and a casino shill as a young woman. "I am impatient with people who do not make full use of all their capabilities," she explained in 1962. She admired pilots and hoped to earn a pilot license, but instead worked as an aircraft mechanic during World War II, at Hamilton Air Force Base. She decided to pursue further education in mechanical engineering at the University of California Berkeley, where she earned a bachelor of Science degree in 1949, with honors.  Her graduate education was funded in part by a National Research Council fellowship to study aeronautics in Stockholm, Sweden.

Career
As a young engineer van der Wal worked at Douglas Aircraft as a data analyst on the Nike missile program, and later designing missile systems for the Ramo-Wooldridge Corporation. Starting in 1958, she was the project engineer on three MIA (Mouse-in-Able) launches from Cape Canaveral, as head of bioastronautics at Space Technology Laboratories. She was named the Los Angeles Times's "1960 Woman of the Year in Science" for her work.  When asked if she would want to go into space herself, she answered, "I'd go in a minute, if they'd let me." In 1961 she was honored as "outstanding woman scientist" by the Wives' Wing of the Aerospace Medical Association. That same year, she won the Society of Women Engineers Achievement Award for her contributions to bioengineering and bioastronautics. She worked on many projects to deserve this award including, Project MIA, as aforementioned, which studied the psychological effects of U.S. space flight using mice as the test subjects. She also focused on the design of manned spacecraft as well as escape and recovery systems for astronauts.

Laurel Van der Wal was the first woman appointed to the Los Angeles Board of Airport Commissioners, in 1961, and served as a commissioner until 1967. In 1968, she served as Los Angeles International Airport's planner.

Laurel van der Wal was director of the Southern California chapter of the American Rocket Society, where she took particular interest in partnering with Explorer Scouts to teach children about space and aeronautics. "Kids all over the world are excited about space," she explained in 1960, "because this is the challenge to their generation." As the space program gained popularity in the 1960s, van der Wal was a popular speaker at women's clubs, teachers' meetings, and other events. In 1968, she explained that the children she taught "... are the most important thing ever to happen to me, ever."

In the early 1970s, she wrote several reports for the Rand Corporation about planning a more effective transportation system.  In 1974 she took a job doing transportation planning in Nigeria, but she discovered on arrival that the government had changed and she was no longer employed there.  She returned to Los Angeles to work for the Southern California Association of Governments for twelve years.  In her later years, she was a noted activist on behalf of slow growth in Santa Monica, California, and was an advisor to the Santa Monica Coalition for a Liveable City.

Personal life
Laurel van der Wal married fellow engineer William Henry Roennau in 1961, in Arlington, Virginia. The Roennaus had two sons, Jonathan and Michael.  Laurel and William later divorced. She retired in the late 1980s, and died in August 2009, in Santa Monica.

References

1924 births
2009 deaths
People from San Francisco
People from Santa Monica, California
UC Berkeley College of Engineering alumni
American aerospace engineers
American women engineers
Activists from California
Engineers from California
20th-century American engineers
20th-century women engineers
20th-century American women
21st-century American women